First Men in the Moon is a 1964 British science fiction film, produced by Charles H. Schneer, directed by Nathan Juran, and starring Edward Judd, Martha Hyer and Lionel Jeffries. The film, distributed by Columbia Pictures, is an adaptation by screenwriter Nigel Kneale of H. G. Wells' 1901 novel The First Men in the Moon.

Ray Harryhausen provided the stop-motion animation effects, which include the Selenites, giant caterpillar-like "Moon Cows" and the large-brained Grand Lunar.

The film was made five years prior to man first landing on the Moon.

Plot
In 1964, the United Nations has launched a rocket flight to the Moon. A multi-national group of astronauts in the UN spacecraft land, believing themselves to be the first lunar explorers. However, they discover a Union Jack flag on the surface and a note mentioning Katherine Callender, which claims the Moon for Queen Victoria.

Attempting to trace Callender in the records office in Dymchurch in Kent, south-east England, the UN authorities discover that she has died, but that her husband Arnold Bedford is still living in a nursing home known as "The Limes". The home's staff do not let him watch television reports of the Moon expedition because, according to the matron, it "excites him". Bedford's repeated lunar claims are dismissed as senile delusion. The UN representatives question him about the Moon, and he tells them his story, which is shown in flashback.

In 1899, Arnold Bedford lives in a romantic spot, Cherry Cottage, next to a canal lock in Dymchurch. His fiancée, Katherine Callender, known as Kate, arrives by car (driving herself), visiting the house for the first time. It is implied that Bedford is in financial difficulties by a letter about his rent being well past due. They meet a nearby neighbour, inventor Joseph Cavor, who wants to buy the cottage, just in case his experiments should damage it. Kate agrees to this on Bedfords behalf. Bedford begins spending time at Cavor's house, where the inventor has a large laboratory. He has developed a substance, Cavorite, that will let anything it is applied to or made of nullify the force of gravity. He plans to use it to travel to the Moon. Bedford has deeds drawn up and signed in Kate's name selling the cottage to Cavor for £5000...(in reality he is selling something that he does not own).

Cavor tempts Bedford by telling him there are gold nuggets on the Moon. He has already built a spherical spaceship in the greenhouse next to the cottage. The sphere is lined inside with green velvet, and it has electric lights. There is an explosion at Cavor's house just as Kate arrives at the cottage. This is caused by Cavor's assistant, Gibbs, leaving for the local pub instead of watching the boiler used for processing the Cavorite. He shows her deep sea diving suits intended to keep them both alive while on the lunar surface. The production of Cavorite is increased. Kate brings some things for the trip: gin and bitters, chickens, and an elephant gun. But she gives Bedford an ultimatum: "Cavorite or me". Back at the cottage, Kate is served with a summons by a bailiff accompanied by a silent policeman. She has been charged with selling a property she does not own. Bedford and Cavor are just about to leave when Kate angrily hammers on the outside of the sphere wanting to know what he has done. They pull her inside just before the sphere launches.

On the long journey to the Moon they eat only sardines. It is not explained how the craft is steered, but opening a blind causes the sphere to veer toward the Sun. They eventually crash land on the lunar surface, and both men don the diving suits. Kate is placed inside an  air-tight compartment since she is unable to accompany them.

While exploring the lunar surface, Bedford and Cavor fall down a vertical shaft, where there is breathable air. They discover an insectoid population, the Selenites, living beneath the surface in large caverns. (Cavor coins this name for the creatures after the Greek goddess of the Moon, Selene). While being herded by them,  Bedford attacks a group of Selenites out of fear, killing several, despite Cavor's horrified protests. After escaping, the two men discover that the sphere, still containing Kate, has been dragged into the underground city.

They are attacked by a giant caterpillar-like "Moon Bull", which pursues them until the Selenites are able to dispatch it with their ray weapons. Cavor and Bedford see the city's power station, a perpetual motion machine powered by sunlight. The Selenites quickly learn English and interrogate Cavor, who believes they wish to exchange scientific knowledge. Cavor has a discussion with the "Grand Lunar", the ruling entity of the Selenites. Bedford makes the assumption that Cavor, and presumably all humanity, is now on trial, he attempts to kill the Grand Lunar with the elephant gun, failing because of Cavor's interference. Now running for their lives, Bedford manages to find the sphere, and he and Kate are able to make an escape. Cavor voluntarily stays behind on the Moon.

Bedford flies the sphere up a vertical shaft of light, shattering the massive window-like covering at the top, and he and Kate return to Earth. He concludes his story by mentioning that they came down in the sea off the coast of Zanzibar, their sphere sinking without trace. They managed to swim ashore, but Cavor's ultimate fate remained unknown to them.

In the present, Bedford, the UN party, and newspaper reporters watch on television the latest events on the Moon. The UN astronauts have broken into the Selenite's underground city and find it deserted and decaying. The ruined city begins to crumble and collapse, forcing the astronauts to hastily retreat to the surface. Seconds later the entire lunar city is completely destroyed. Bedford realizes that the Selenites must have succumbed to Cavor's common cold virus to which they had no immunity.

Cast

 Edward Judd as Bedford
 Martha Hyer as Kate
 Lionel Jeffries as Joseph Cavor
 Miles Malleson as Dymchurch registrar
 Norman Bird as Stuart
 Gladys Henson as nursing home matron
 Hugh McDermott as Richard Challis, UN Space Agency
 Betty McDowall as Margaret Hoy, UN Space Agency
 Huw Thomas* as announcer
 Erik Chitty* as Gibbs, Cavor's servant in Dymchurch
 Peter Finch* as the bailiff
 Marne Maitland* as Dr. Tok, UN Space Agency
* Not credited on-screen.

Production

Development
Harryhausen was planning on following Jason and the Argonauts (1963) with a version of H.G. Wells' 1904 novel The Food of the Gods and How It Came to Earth when he met with writer Nigel Kneale. Harryhausen had long wanted to film Wells' First Men in the Moon but producer Charles Schneer was not enthusiastic, in part due to worries about the film's period setting. Kneale thought it was an excellent idea, however, and he and Harryhausen managed to persuade Schneer to make it.

Schneer said Kneale "is a very dour, straightforward, serious classicist. He was recognized in England as being the contemporary science-fiction 
screenwriter. I hired him because we needed his technical expertise. Then, we superimposed on that what we thought audiences 
would appreciate".

Another writer was brought on to rework Kneale's script. According to Kneale: "They wanted to jazz it up, make it funnier than I had imagined". He says this inspired the casting of Lionel Jeffries.

Kneale said in the book, Judd's character "was a blundering creature and it seemed important to keep that". The writer says he knew that a country would get to the Moon relatively soon and discover there were no Selenites. This is why he added to the script that the Selenites were wiped out by a cold virus carried to the Moon by the professor, an idea Kneale says he took directly from The War of the Worlds.

Director
This was the third collaboration between producer Charles Schneer and director Nathan Juran. Schneer said Juran "was an excellent man for what he did, but he wasn't an actor's director. Many of our actors were used to more help from a director than he gave them. They felt a little adrift when they were expected to get on with their work without any great directorial assist. Jerry wasn't very patient with actors. He couldn't tolerate actors who wanted to know what their character's motivation was. He wanted to get on with the job he was hired to do".

Casting
Schneer cast Judd from his performance in The Day the Earth Caught Fire (1961). Edward Judd was under contract to Columbia Pictures. "I had never done anything like that at the time, so I thought it would be fun", Judd said. "Since Lionel was already a great chum of mine, I knew we would have laughs on the set".

Martha Hyer's character was not in the original drafts of the scripts but was introduced later.

Designs
Ray Harryhausen used NASA blueprints as inspiration for the UN's lunar lander when he was designing the film's sets.

Sculptor Bryan Kneale constructed the Selenites from Harryhausen's designs.

Spacesuits used

The spacesuit type worn by the film's UN Astronauts is actually the Windak high-altitude pressure suit, developed for the Royal Air Force. Each was fitted with a 1960s-type aqualung cylinder worn as a backpack. These pressure suits would also be used in two Doctor Who stories: William Hartnell's final story "The Tenth Planet" (1966) and the Patrick Troughton-era "The Wheel in Space" (1968). They also appear in the original Star Wars trilogy as the costumes for Bossk and Bo Shek.

Shooting
Filming began on 1 October 1963.

Schneer convinced Harryhausen the film's commercial prospects would be improved if it was shot in Panavision. "Ray was terrified of Panavision", said the producer. "All I had to do was suggest something different to him, and he would get nervous".

"After you got past the first couple of reels, it was a funny film", said Juran. "Lionel was a swell actor. I liked him very much. His performance added immeasurably to the picture's entertainment value. He played it tongue-in-cheek but being such a good comic actor he controlled himself and never went too far. He made a great team with Edward Judd. Their personalities, one against the other, were just perfect".

"It was fun to do, but it was bloody hard work," said Judd. "Lionel called it 'acting with chalk marks' because we were pointing at things that weren't there and dealing with blue backing and traveling mattes".

Harryhausen would explain to the actors what the creatures would eventually look like just before they shot the scenes involving them.

"Lionel and I didn't like Jerry's working methods too much," said Judd. "He was more of a technician than an actor's director. We always thought of him as an art director, which of course he had been".

Reception

Critical reception
Among contemporary reviews, Variety wrote, "Ray Harryhausen and his special effects men have another high old time in this piece of science-fiction hokum filmed in Dynamation", adding that "Wells' novel and has been neatly updated", and concluding that "The three principals play second fiddle to the special effects and art work, which are impressive in color, construction and animation".

However, The New York Times wrote, "Only the most indulgent youngsters should derive much stimulation - let alone fun - from the tedious, heavyhanded science-fiction vehicle that arrived yesterday from England".

The Guardian called it "good of its type".

TV Guide called it "An enjoyable science fiction film". and Blu-ray.com highly recommended the film as "a fun and exciting viewing experience".

Box-office
Kinematograph Weekly called the film a "money maker" at the British box office for 1964.

Nonetheless the film was a box-office disappointment. Harryhausen felt this was due to the inclusion of too much comedy.

Schneer said he preferred the film to Jason and the Argonauts because "it was set in the Victorian era, whereas Jason took place in a much further removed period of history. Also, I thought the humor in it was delicious, whereas there wasn't much humor in Jason." The producer says Harryhausen felt "fantasy film fans are dead serious about these pictures and have no sense of humor. So, who am I to quarrel with him?"

Kneale says the final film was "all right. It could have been better if it had been a bit less farcical; that would have been more imaginative."

Legacy
Schneer says that when the real Moon landing happened, NASA "had no footage showing the space capsule separating from the 'mother ship' and landing on the Moon's surface. All they had were shots of Neil Armstrong walking around". NASA went to Columbia Pictures and used the opening sequence of First Men on the Moon. "They used those portions of it which were applicable to their needs," said the producer.

Following the film, Harryhausen and Schneer did not work together for five years.

Comic book adaptation
 Gold Key: First Men in the Moon (March 1965)

Notes

References

External links
 
 
 
 
 

1964 films
1960s science fiction films
1960s science fiction adventure films
British space adventure films
British science fiction films
Columbia Pictures films
Films about astronauts
Films based on works by H. G. Wells
Films set in 1899
Films set in 1964
Films set in England
Films shot in England
Moon in film
British monster movies
1960s monster movies
Films using stop-motion animation
Films directed by Nathan Juran
Films adapted into comics
Films scored by Laurie Johnson
Films produced by Charles H. Schneer
1960s English-language films
1960s British films